

Ma 
Maglice (municipality Prozor-Rama), Mali Ograđenik, Malo Polje (municipality Mostar), Markovići, Mašići, Mazlina

Me 
Međugorje, Meopotočje (municipality Prozor-Rama)

Mi 
Milanovići, Miljkovići (municipality Mostar), Mirke, Mirvići, Mirvići na Podhranjenu

Ml 
Mladeškovići, Mluša (municipality Prozor-Rama)

Mo 
Mokro, Morinac, Mostar (Herzegovina-Neretva Canton), Moševići (municipality Neum)

Mr 
Mrakovo, Mravi, Mravinjac, Mravljača, Mrkosovice, Mrkovi

Lists of settlements in the Federation of Bosnia and Herzegovina (A-Ž)